The 2008 Korean Tour was a season on the Korean Tour, a series of professional golf tournaments. The table below shows the season results.

Schedule
The following table lists official events during the 2008 season.

Order of Merit
The Order of Merit was based on prize money won during the season, calculated using a points-based system.

Notes

References

External links

2008 Korean Tour
2008 in golf
2008 in South Korean sport